Zərgər is a village in the Fuzuli District of Azerbaijan.

Etymology 
The word Zərgər means goldsmith in Azerbaijani language.

References 

Populated places in Fuzuli District